Faustin Betbeder was a French illustrator, caricaturist and prototypical comics artist.

Life and career

He was born in Soissons, France in 1847 and lived until  sometime around 1914. He became an artist, noted for his unflattering caricatures of personalities from both sides of the Franco-Prussian war and its aftermath. He had difficulty in finding a publisher for the first set of these in 1870 and finally published them himself, selling over 50,000 copies. After the war he moved to Britain where he produced a less political series of caricatures of well-known British personalities to be published in The London Sketch-book, "An illustrated newspaper and magazine" published from 1873 until 1874 by James Mortimer, editor of The London Figaro. The most famous of these is that of Charles Darwin as an ape holding up a hand mirror for another ape.

References

External links
 Lambiek Comiclopedia page.

1847 births
1914 deaths
French cartoonists
French caricaturists
French comics artists